Outer Upper Inner is an EP by the Raleigh, NC-based psychedelic rock band Birds of Avalon. The album was released by Volcom Entertainment on March 18, 2008.

Track listing
 "Measure of the Same" 3:27
 "Shakey Tiger" 4:19
 "Earthbound" 5:14
 "Hazy 98" 3:05
 "The Reeds" 2:38
 "Keep It Together, Thackery" 4:51

References

2008 EPs
Birds of Avalon albums
Volcom Entertainment EPs